Flagler may refer to:

Places
 Flagler, Colorado
 Flagler County, Florida, named for Henry Morrison Flagler
 Flagler Beach, Florida
 Cape John Flagler, Greenland

People with the surname
 Adam Flagler (born 1999), American basketball player
 Henry Morrison Flagler, American businessman responsible for development of much of the Florida East Coast.
 Terrence Flagler, American football player
 Thomas T. Flagler, American politician

Other uses
 Flagler College, a private college in Florida named for Henry Morrison Flagler, located on part of his estate
 Flagler train or Dixie Flagler